Secret Seven (Secret Seven – ) is a 2017 Thai television series starring Sutatta Udomsilp (Punpun) together with seven actors namely Vorakorn Sirisorn (Kang), Tawan Vihokratana (Tay), Oabnithi Wiwattanawarang (Oab), Thanat Lowkhunsombat (Lee), Jirakit Thawornwong (Mek), Atthaphan Phunsawat (Gun) and Chonlathorn Kongyingyong (Captain).

Produced by GMMTV and directed by Nuttapong Mongkolsawas and Pawis Sowsrion, the series was one of the six television series for 2017 showcased by GMMTV in their "6 Natures+" event on 2 March 2017. It premiered on One31 and LINE TV on 19 August 2017, airing on Saturdays at 22:00 ICT and 23:00 ICT, respectively. The first seven episodes aired until 30 September 2017 after entertainment programs were temporarily stopped for the month of October in preparation for the royal cremation ceremonies of Thai King Bhumibol Adulyadej. The broadcast of the series resumed on 4 November 2017 and concluded on 2 December 2017.

Synopsis 
This is the story of Padlom (Sutatta Udomsilp), a lonely girl who is afraid of love. One day, someone tells her that a guy among the seven young men secretly likes her. Padlom goes into a journey of finding out who among the seven guys is secretly in love with her.

Cast and characters 
Below are the cast of the series:

Main 
 Sutatta Udomsilp (Punpun) as Padlom
 Vorakorn Sirisorn (Kang) as Pok
 Tawan Vihokratana (Tay) as Alan
 Oabnithi Wiwattanawarang (Oab) as Gent
 Thanat Lowkhunsombat (Lee) as Play
 Jirakit Thawornwong (Mek) as Id
 Atthaphan Phunsawat (Gun) as Liftoil
 Chonlathorn Kongyingyong (Captain) as Neo

Supporting 
 Suttatip Wutchaipradit (Ampere) as Spoil
 Kornkan Sutthikoses (Arm) as Gun
 Weerayut Chansook (Arm) as Play's guitarist
 Sarunthorn Klaiudom (Mean) as Grace
 Sarocha Burintr (Gigie) as Grace, Id's girlfriend

Guest role 
 Manapat Techakumphu (Bonne) as Jack

Soundtracks

International broadcast 
 – The series premiered on 27 September 2020 on GMA News TV airing on Sundays at 14:00 PST. Rerun of the series starts on February 28, 2021 Every Sundays at 10:00 PST on Heart of Asia Channel.

References

External links 
 Secret Seven on GMM 25 website 
 
 

Television series by GMMTV
2017 Thai television series debuts
2017 Thai television series endings
One 31 original programming